The Revolutionary Government of the Philippines was a revolutionary government established in the Spanish East Indies on June 23, 1898, during the Spanish–American War, by Emilio Aguinaldo, its initial and only president. The government succeeded a dictatorial government which had been established by Aguinaldo on June 18, and which was dissolved and replaced by this government upon its establishment. This government endured until January 23, 1899, when the proclamation of the Malolos Constitution established an insurgent Philippine Republic government which replaced it.

Four governmental departments were initially created, each having several bureaus: foreign relations, marine and commerce; war and public works; police, justice, instruction and hygiene; finance, agriculture, and industry. A Revolutionary Congress was established with power "[t]o watch over the general interest of the Philippine people, and carrying out of the revolutionary laws; to discuss and vote upon said laws; to discuss and approve, prior to their ratification, treaties and loans; to examine and approve the accounts presented annually by the secretary of finance, as well as extraordinary and other taxes which may hereafter be imposed."

On August 14, 1898, two days after the Battle of Manila of the Spanish–American War and about two months after Aguinaldo's proclamation of this revolutionary government, the United States established a military government in the Philippines, with General Merritt acting as military governor.

Government

Cabinet 
Aguinaldo appointed his first cabinet on June 15, consisting of Baldomero Aguinaldo as secretary of war and public works, Leanardo Ibarra as secretary of the interior and Mariano Trías as secretary of finance; the secretaryship of foreign relations, marine, and commerce was provisionally left in the charge of the presidency. On September 23, the cabinet was reorganized to six departments.

On January 2, 1899, when it became certain that Cayetano Arellano would not accept the role of secretary of foreign relations, the role fell to Apolinario Mabini. Mabini had to that time been Aguinaldo's principal advisor and he was also named the president of the cabinet.

References

Further reading 
 
 
 , (published online 2005, University of Michigan Library)
 
 

Former countries in Philippine history
Philippine–American War
Philippine Revolution
States and territories established in 1898
States and territories disestablished in 1899